Harrogate Gasworks Railway was an industrial railway in the town of Harrogate, North Yorkshire, England. The line was a narrow gauge railway that ran between Bilton Junction on the Leeds and Thirsk Railway, to the Harrogate Gas Company's (HGC) works at New Park, north of the town centre. It opened in 1908 to carry inbound coal for gasification, and was closed to traffic in 1956. The railway was noted for its tight gauge restrictions in the tunnel through New Park. Two of its steam locomotives have survived into preservation, and are still in use on heritage railways.

History 
A company to provide gas for Harrogate was formed in 1845, gaining an Act of Parliament in 1846, with the gasworks being built in the same year as the act was granted. Bilton Junction was where the Leeds Northern Line diverged with one line south-west to  railway station, and another south-east towards . Due to the complaints from the local population regarding damage to the roads caused by the transport of coal from Bilton Junction to the gasworks, and the noise and pollution from the steam-powered road vehicles, a railway was built between 1907 and 1908 by the owners of the gasworks. Requests to the North Eastern Railway to build the railway line were refused, so the company built it themselves. The directors of the company petitioned the shareholders to raise £20,000 for a railway capable of carrying  of coal per year. The transhipment facility at Bilton junction allowed for inward freighted coal for gasification to be loaded onto trucks on the narrow gauge line using gravity, which was expected to take only two minutes to transfer the load into four wagons. By-products from the gasification process at HGC (including tar), were similarly back-loaded at Bilton transhipment point onto main-line wagons, this time with the narrow-gauge wagons above the mainline wagons, with gravity loading again being the way of transhipping the gooods.

The tunnel had one ventilation shaft, and it took an s-bend course in the southern half of the bore underneath the Skipton to Harrogate road (what would become the A59). The section of tunnel under the A59 road was re-inforced with brick. The tunnel took the railway under some houses and the road, to exit on the eastern side of the Harrogate to Ripon road (what is now the A61); the gasworks was located on the other side of the road. The tunnel was the first part of the line to be constructed (in April 1907), via a  shaft. Wilson was impressed by the Thomas Green locomotives he had ordered, and ordered another (known as "Barber") for the gasworks line.

Several locomotives were used on the line, including a Hunslet 4-6-0, ex War Department locomotive built for the First World War susbequently named Spencer, and a Peckett engine, numbered 2050 (the works number). The most famous locomotive to work the line was Barber, named after the gasworks company's owner, Francis Barber. The locomotive is rare due to its cut down cab, necessitated because of the low-height gauge of the New Park Tunnel. So tight were the restrictions in the tunnel, that a hatch was cut into the back of the cab which would allow the crew to evacuate onto the line, rather than through the side of the locomotive. Spencer was initially a  gauge loco, and was converted to  gauge, and had modifications to its height so that it could run within the tunnel. Francis Barber's name was also applied to the line itself, being known locally as the Barber Line. Further locomotives were purchased, including a Peckett steam engine, and a Drewry diesel shunter.

Initially the line was worked only two of three days per week, but as demand for gas and electricity grew, so the operation was expanded, which also meant purchasing extra locomotives. However, the new engine (Spencer) had 22% less power than Barber, and could not haul the coal wagons up the 1-in-21 incline to Knox bridge, so a diversion was built with a gradient of 1-in-25. By this time, it was discovered that road transport was some 33% more economical than the railway. This caused the owners to abandon the railway, and go back to road transportation.

The last train ran in July 1956, after which all of the structures of the line were demolished. In 2007, a small museum opened next to the southern portal of the tunnel. The New Park School created a secret garden to commemorate the railway.

Rolling stock 

One short wooden-built coal wagon was retained purely for carrying coal for the steam locomotive engines.

Notes

References

Sources

External links 
Map from 1952 showing the curve of the tunnel at gridref SE297573

Harrogate
Industrial railways in England
2 ft gauge railways in England
Closed railway lines in Yorkshire and the Humber
Railway lines opened in 1908
Railway lines closed in 1956
Rail transport in North Yorkshire